Gond Umri railway station serves Gondumri and surrounding villages in Bhandara District in Maharashtra, India.

References

Bhandara district
Railway stations in Bhandara district
Nagpur SEC railway division